Bill Cooke (31 May 1888 – 8 December 1950) was a former Australian rules footballer who played with Collingwood in the Victorian Football League (VFL).

Notes

External links 

Bill Cooke's profile at Collingwood Forever

1888 births
1950 deaths
Australian rules footballers from Western Australia
Collingwood Football Club players
Mines Rovers Football Club players